Glycomyces dulcitolivorans is a bacterium from the genus of Glycomyces which has been isolated from rhizospheric soil from the plant Triticum aestivum.

References 

Actinomycetia
Bacteria described in 2018